La Muerte de Mikel is a 1984 Spanish film directed by Imanol Uribe, starring Imanol Arias. The film tells in flash back, the story of a gay member of ETA who died under mysterious circumstances.

Plot
The film opens at Mikel's funeral mass. A flashback spins out the circumstances of his life and death.

Mikel, a young pharmacist involved in Basque Nationalist politics, is living in Lekeitio, a Basque coastal town. When his wife, Begoña, returns from a long trip abroad, he picks her up at the airport. Their marriage is unhappy; the relationship between the couple is tense. Begoña wants to resolve their problems, but Mikel is indifferent. In the encounter after Begoña's return, the couple visits Mikel's domineering mother, Doña Maria Luisa, a widow who lives in the same small town. The relationship between mother and son is also fractured. Mikel and Begoña have an argument when she tells him that she has discussed their sexual problems with his mother. They go out to have supper to the home of a pair of friends: Martín, a doctor who has arrived at the town fleeing the Chilean dictatorship, and Martin's wife, Arantza. The calm of town is disrupted with the senseless death of two young people, who failed to stop in a nocturnal control and were killed by the Civil Guard. Mikel attends a political meeting where he is offered a seat in the next local election for the Basque independent party to which he belongs. Mikel takes parts in local festivities. At dawn, he arrives drunk at home. Having sex with his wife, Mikel bites Begoña's clitoris during an alcohol-fuelled attempt at oral sex. This incident effectively marks the end of their marriage.

The next day Martín, takes cares of Begoña's wounds inflected in the attack and as a friend and mentor to Mikel, he recommends him a therapist in Bilbao. After his first session, Mikel joins an old friend in a bar and gets drunk.  Mikel wakes up the following morning, knowing that he has had sex with Fama, a female impersonator, whose show he has seen at the bar. Realizing what he has done, humiliated and confused, Mikel embarks on a suicidal drive down the wrong side of the motorway, but swerves aside in time to avoid a crash.

Begoña moves out and a new chapter begins in Mikel's life. Uninvited, Fama comes to the town and gives Mikel a surprise visit in the pharmacy where he works. She offers him emotional support and recounting the story of her life, she encourages him to come to term with his sexuality. Mikel has a meeting with Begoña and is forgiven by her. He tells her that never before he has seen the future with promise like now. However, when his homosexual relationship becomes public, his political comrades reject him. Mikel's proud mother is horrified with her son homosexual relationship. Mikel is arrested and questioned about ETA activities. His friend, Martin, has confessed that years ago both helped a wounded ETA member to escape to France. Resisting with dignity the violent attempts of the police to get information out of him, Mikel comes out of prison enthusiastic about developing his relationship with Fama. The next morning his brother finds him dead in bed in his mother's home. His death is not explained, but cinematography points clearly to the mother, who has already stated that she will not accept the public humiliation of Mikel's homosexual relationship. Mikel's political comrades who rejected him in life appropriate his death as a forum for political protest.

Cast
 Imanol Arias as Mikel
 Monserrat Salvador as Doña Maria Luisa, Mikel's mother
 Amaia Lasa as Begoña
 Fama (Fernando Telletxea) as Fama  
 Martín Adjermián as Martín
 Alicia Sánchez as Arantxa
 Xabier Elorriaga as Iñaki, Mikel's brother

Reception
La muerte de Mikel was filmed in Lekeitio, a small town in the Bay of Biscay. Some scenes, like those that take place in the gay-club with Fama, were  shot in Bilbao.

La muerte de Mikel did very well at the box office. It was the most successful film in a relative boom resulting from increased Basque government subsidies between 1982 and 1987.
It was also among the top-grossing Spanish films of 1984 and precipitated interest in regional Spanish Cinema. Uribe became the best known Basque filmmakers of the 1980s with this, his strongest film up to that point.

Like The Crying Game (1992) and Kiss of the Spider Woman (1985), La muerte de Mikel juxtaposes revolutionary politics with homosexuality to examine ideological suppression of difference.

Notes

References
Schwartz, Ronald, The Great Spanish Films: 1950 - 1990, Scarecrow Press, London, 1991, 
 Stone, Robe, Spanish Cinema, Pearson Education, 2002, 
 Evans, Jo, '' Imanol Uribe's La muerte de Mikel: Policing the Gaze/Mind the Gap, 109 Bulletin of Hispanic Studies, Volume 76, Number 1, 1 January 1999.

External links
 

1984 films
1980s Spanish-language films
Spanish LGBT-related films
Films scored by Alberto Iglesias
Gay-related films
Films about ETA (separatist group)